Go Chuck Yourself (released as Happy Live Surprise in Japan) is a live album by Canadian rock band Sum 41 recorded in London, Ontario in April 2005.

It was first released on December 21, 2005, in Japan, and was packaged with a bonus DVD featuring five songs from the show and Basketball Butcher. The US and European version was released on March 7, 2006, without the DVD..

Track listing

References

Sum 41 live albums
Albums produced by Tom Lord-Alge
2006 live albums
Aquarius Records (Canada) live albums